Oenotrichia  is a genus of ferns in the family Dennstaedtiaceae in the major group Pteridophytes, and was described as a genus in 1929. It is native to New Caledonia.

Species
 Oenotrichia macgillivrayi (E. Fourn.) Brownlie - New Caledonia
 Oenotrichia maxima (E. Fourn.) Copel. - New Caledonia

formerly included
Oenotrichia dissecta (C. T. White & Goy) S. B. Andrews, synonym of Lastreopsis dissecta (C. T. White & Goy) Labiak, Sundue & R. C. Moran
Oenotrichia tenera (Christ) Tagawa, synonym of  Microlepia tenera Christ - China
Oenotrichia tripinnata (F. Muell. ex Benth.) Copel., synonym of Lastreopsis tripinnata (F. Muell. ex Benth.) Labiak, Sundue & R. C. Moran

References

Dennstaedtiaceae
Ferns of Oceania
Ferns of Australia
Flora of New Caledonia
Fern genera